The Azerbaijan women's national football team represents Azerbaijan in international women's football. They are currently 67th in the FIFA Women's World Rankings. Azerbaijan has never qualified for any international tournament. The majority of Azerbaijan's home matches are held at the national stadium, Tofiq Bahramov Stadium.

History

2000s
In 2005, the AFFA had planned to send a team to the Women's World Cup qualifying, finally, the team withdrew before it started the qualifying tournament. On 18 November 2006 Azerbaijan played its first game against Romania in the city of Mogosoaia for the 2009 Euro qualifiers with a team led by Shamil Haydarov and captained by Kifayat Osmanova, losing 4–1 with its first goal scored by Svetlana Milyukhina, they played two matches later, in which they won against Estonia and lost against Bulgaria, they ended up eliminated from the tournament with 3 points. In 2009, Azerbaijan participated for the first time in a World Cup qualifying in Group 8, with Belgium, Czech Republic, Sweden and Wales, where it played three games, one won, one drawn and one lost before the end of the year.

2010s
In 2010, Azerbaijan played five games for the qualifiers, losing them all and being eliminated from the competition with 4 points, a game won, one drawn lost six games, scoring two goals and conceding sixteen. After that campaign, the team did not play to date back and has not scheduled any competition or friendly match. The team not even entered the 2015 World Cup Qualifiers.

Team image

Nicknames
The Azerbaijan women's national football team has been known or nicknamed as the " (The Land of Fire)".

Home stadium
Azerbaijan plays their home matches on the Tofiq Bahramov Republican Stadium and the Ismet Qaibov Stadium.

Results and fixtures

The following is a list of match results in the last 12 months, as well as any future matches that have been scheduled.
Legend

2022

Azerbaijan Results and Fixtures – Soccerway.com

Head-to-head record
The following table shows Azerbaijan's all-time international record, correct as of 1 June 2018.

Source: Worldfootball

Coaching staff

Current coaching staff

Manager history

Players

Current squad
The following players were called up for a home match against Malta on 26 October 2021.

Caps and goals are correct, as of 23 February 2021.

Recent call ups
The following players have been called up to the squad in the past 12 months.

Records

*Active players in bold, statistics correct as of 21 August 2021.

Most capped players

Top goalscorers

Competitive record

FIFA Women's World Cup

*Draws include knockout matches decided on penalty kicks.

Olympic Games

*Draws include knockout matches decided on penalty kicks.

UEFA Women's Championship

*Draws include knockout matches decided on penalty kicks.

See also

Azerbaijan women's national football team
Azerbaijan women's national football team results
List of Azerbaijan women's international footballers
Azerbaijan women's national under-20 football team
Azerbaijan women's national under-17 football team

References

External links
Football Federation of Azerbaijan

 
European women's national association football teams
National
National, women's